Little Big Burger is a hamburger restaurant chain, based in Portland, Oregon, United States.

History
The chain was founded by Micah Camden and Katie Poppe in 2010. The business was sold to Chanticleer Holdings in 2015. There are locations in five U.S. states (California, North Carolina, Oregon, Texas, and Washington), including a dozen in the Portland metropolitan area, as of 2019.

Workers sought to unionize in 2019.

See also
 List of companies based in Oregon
 List of hamburger restaurants

References

External links
 
 

2010 establishments in Oregon
Fast-food hamburger restaurants
Restaurant chains in the United States
Restaurants established in 2010
Restaurants in Portland, Oregon